Drepanotrema cimex is a species of gastropods belonging to the family Planorbidae.

The species is found in America.

References

Gastropods
Taxa named by Moïse Étienne Moricand
Gastropods described in 1838